Yidiel Islay Contreras García (born 27 November 1992) is a Spanish hurdler of Cuban origin. He represented Spain at the 2015 World Championships and 2016 World Indoor Championships. His personal bests are 13.35 seconds in the 110 metres hurdles (-1.0 m/s, La Roche-sur-Yon 2015) and 7.64 seconds in the 60 metres hurdles (Łódź 2016).

Competition record

References

External links

1992 births
Living people
Spanish male hurdlers
World Athletics Championships athletes for Spain
People from Cienfuegos
Cuban emigrants to Spain
Athletes (track and field) at the 2016 Summer Olympics
Olympic athletes of Spain
Mediterranean Games silver medalists for Spain
Mediterranean Games medalists in athletics
Athletes (track and field) at the 2018 Mediterranean Games
European Games competitors for Spain
Athletes (track and field) at the 2019 European Games